Ramón Couto Florida (December 8, 1906 – February 17, 1977) was a Cuban catcher in the Negro leagues in the 1930s.

A native of Havana, Cuba, Couto played for the New York Cubans in 1935. He died in 1977 at age 70.

References

External links
Baseball statistics and player information from Baseball-Reference Black Baseball Stats and Seamheads

1906 births
1977 deaths
Place of death missing
New York Cubans players
Baseball players from Havana
Cuban expatriate baseball players in the United States
Baseball catchers